Bhavsor village is situated in Gujarat state of India.

Villages in Mehsana district